Salzbach (in its upper course: Rambach) is a stream in the city of Wiesbaden, in the state of Hesse, Germany. It is a tributary of the Rhine.

See also
List of rivers of Hesse

External links

References

Rivers of Hesse
Rivers of the Taunus
Rivers of Germany